Robert Jean Knecht (born 20 September 1926) is a historian, an expert on 16th-century France, Emeritus Professor of French history at the University of Birmingham, where he taught during 1956–1994.

Biography
The only child of French parents living in London, he was educated at the French Lycée in London and the Salesian College, Farnborough. He graduated at King's College London in 1948 and qualified as a teacher in 1949. In 1953 he was awarded the M.A. degree of London University for which he submitted a thesis on Cardinal John Morton and his episcopal colleagues. Knecht was then employed by a firm of industrial designers to collect and exhibit old prints and to write explanatory booklets for three theme pubs in London. In 1954 he carried out research on MPs in the Cinque Ports for the early Tudor volume of the History of Parliament and wrote the chapter on schools in Salisbury during the 19th century for the Victoria County History. Though trained as a medieval historian, he was appointed in 1956 as assistant-lecturer in early modern history at the University of Birmingham where he has chosen to remain for the rest of his professional career. In 1984 he was awarded the degree of D. Litt (Birmingham). His earliest book was The Voyage of Sir Nicholas Carewe published in 1959 by Cambridge University Press for the Roxburghe Club.

In the 1950s Knecht travelled widely in Europe, often cycling, as tour leader for the Students' International Travel Association, based in the U.S.A. and the Ramblers' Association. In 1970 he turned his attention to French history in the sixteenth century and began research on the reign of the French king Francis I, producing the first serious work in English on that king in 1982. This he revised completely for the king's 500th anniversary in 1994. Since then he has published some twenty books on early modern French history.

In 1977 Knecht formed a close association with a group of French art historians led by André Chastel and Jean Guillaume, taking part in several of their summer schools. In May 1994 he was Visiting Fellow of the Ecole des Hautes Etudes en Sciences Sociales in Paris. In 2001 he became a Chevalier de l'Ordre des Palmes académiques.Promoted to the rank of Officier in August 2010. He is a Fellow of the Royal Historical Society, an elected member of the Société de l'Histoire de France and is a co-founder and former Chairman of the Society for the Study of French History (1994–97) and of the Society for Renaissance Studies (1989–92).

Knecht's 2008 book, The French Renaissance Court, has been awarded the Enid McLeod Prize of the Franco-British Society for 2009. His recreations are listening to classical music, visiting art galleries and historic houses, architecture, travel and photography.

List of publications
1959: The Voyage of Sir Nicolas Carewe to the Emperor Charles V in the year 1529, edited from the British Museum manuscript (Egerton 3315, by ) with introduction and notes by R. J. Knecht. Cambridge: Printed for the Roxburghe Club at the University Press. 116 pages. .
1969: Francis I and Absolute Monarchy. London: Historical Association. 31 pages. . .
1982: Francis I. London; New York; Melbourne: Cambridge University Press. 480 pages. . .
1984: French Renaissance Monarchy: Francis I and Henry II. London: Longman. 123 pages. . . 8th impression, 1995: .
1996: French Renaissance Monarchy: Francis I and Henry II, second edition. London; New York: Longman. 145 pages. . .
1989: The French Wars of Religion, 1559–1599. London; New York: Longman. 153 pages. . . Online: Milton: Taylor & Francis, 3rd edition, 2010, 209 pages, . Online: Routledge, 2014, .
1991: Richelieu. London; New York: Longman. 259 pages. . .
1994: Renaissance Warrior and Patron: The Reign of Francis I [expanded and revised version of Francis I]. Cambridge; New York: Cambridge University Press. 612 pages. . .
1998: Un prince de la Renaissance. François Ier et son royaume, translated into French by Patrick Hersant. Paris: Fayard. . .
1996: The Rise and Fall of Renaissance France, 1483–1610. London: Fontana. 668 pages. . .
2001: The Rise and Fall of Renaissance France, 1483–1610, second edition. Oxford; Malden, MA: Blackwell. 591 pages. . .
1997: Catherine de' Medici. Harlow: Addison Wesley Longman Higher Education. 340 pages. . London; New York: Longman, 1998. 340 pages. . .
2003: Catherine De Médicis (1519–1589), translated into French by Sarah Leclerq. Brussels: Le Cri. 346 pages. . .
2000: The French Civil Wars, 1562–1598. Harlow: Longman. 341 pages. . .
2002: The French Religious Wars, 1562–1598. Oxford: Osprey Publishing Limited. 95 pages. . .
2004: The Valois: Kings of France 1328–1589. London: Bloomsbury Academic. 276 pages. . . Online (restricted access).
2007: The Valois: Kings of France 1328–1589, second edition. London: Hambledon Continuum. 276 pages. . .
2008: The French Renaissance Court, 1483–1589, New Haven; London: Yale University Press. 415 pages. . .
2014: Hero or Tyrant? Henry III, King of France, 1574–89, Ashgate, . . London: Routledge, 2016. 356 pages. . .

References

1926 births
Historians of France
Alumni of King's College London
Living people
Academics of the University of Birmingham
Fellows of the Royal Historical Society